Seachnasach mac Donnchadh was an ancestor to the family of O'Shaughnessy.

Seachnasach was a member of the Uí Fiachrach Aidhne dynasty, formerly Kings of Connacht. By the tenth century their power had been reduced to Aidhne, a small kingdom in what is now south County Galway. Seachnasach was a seventeen-time great-grandson of Guaire Aidne mac Colmáin, one of the dynasty's most notable rulers. He was a kinsman of other Uí Fiachrach dynasts such as Giolla Ceallaigh mac Comhaltan, Scannlán mac Fearghal, Eidhean mac Cléireach, and Cathal mac Ógán, all of whom would have descendants who derived their surname from them.

Pedigree
 Seachnasach mac Donnchadh mc. Comahaighe m. Fergal m. Maolciarain m. Maoltuile m. Siodhuine m. Nocba m. Egma m. Gabhnan m. Tobath m. Branan m. Brian m. Murchadh m. Aodh m. Artgail m. Guaire Aidne.

Descendants
Sir Roger O'Shaughnessy of Kinelea, 2nd Baronet O'Shaughnessy of Kinelea
Roger O'Shaughnessy, Captain in the Army of James II of England
William O'Shaughnessy, Major-General and Chief of the Name
Arthur O'Shaughnessy, poet
Baron Shaughnessy, title in the Peerage of the United Kingdom
Eileen O'Shaughnessy, wife of George Orwell
James O'Shaughnessy, author, investor

References
 The Surnames of Ireland, Edward MacLysaght, Dublin, 1978, p. 52 
 Irish Kings and High Kings, Francis John Byrne, 2001 (second edition)
 The Great Book of Irish Genealogies, 257.11, pp. 586-87, volume two, Dubhaltach MacFhirbhisigh; edited, with translation and indices by Nollaig Ó Muraíle, 2003–04; 
 Ordnance Survey Letters Galway 1838 and 1839, p. 194, ed. Michael Herity, MRIA, FourMasters Press, Dublin, 2009; 

People from County Galway
O'Shaughnessy family
10th-century Irish people
Year of birth unknown
Place of birth unknown
Year of death unknown
Place of death unknown